Sylvicola is a genus of wood gnats in the family Anisopodidae. There are more than 80 described species in Sylvicola.

Species
These 89 species belong to the genus Sylvicola:

Sylvicola adornatus Yang & Cui, 1998
Sylvicola albiapex (Lane & d'Adretta, 1958)
Sylvicola albicornis (Edwards, 1923)
Sylvicola alternatus (Say, 1823)
Sylvicola andinus (Edwards, 1930)
Sylvicola annulicornis (Edwards, 1928)
Sylvicola annuliferus (Edwards, 1923)
Sylvicola annulipes (Edwards, 1919)
Sylvicola apicatus (Edwards, 1919)
Sylvicola argentinus (Edwards, 1928)
Sylvicola ater (Edwards, 1919)
Sylvicola baechlii Haenni, 1997
Sylvicola bivittatus (Edwards, 1933)
Sylvicola boraceae (Lane & Andretta, 1958)
Sylvicola borneanus (Edwards, 1933)
Sylvicola brunneus (Vanschuytbroeck, 1965)
Sylvicola caiuasi (Lane & Andretta, 1958)
Sylvicola cinctus (Fabricius, 1787)
Sylvicola distinctus (Brunetti, 1911)
Sylvicola divisus (Brunetti, 1911)
Sylvicola dolorosus (Williston, 1896)
Sylvicola dubius (Macquart, 1850)
Sylvicola fasciatus (Roeder, 1886)
Sylvicola fenestralis (Scopoli, 1763) (window gnat)
Sylvicola festivus (Edwards, 1928)
Sylvicola fluminensis (Lane & Andretta, 1958)
Sylvicola foveatus (Edwards, 1923)
Sylvicola fulvithorax (Meijere, 1924)
Sylvicola funebris (Fuller, 1935)
Sylvicola funereus (Tollet, 1956)
Sylvicola fuscatoides Michelsen, 1999
Sylvicola fuscatus (Fabricius, 1775)
Sylvicola fuscipennis (Macquart, 1838)
Sylvicola glabrifrons (Edwards, 1932)
Sylvicola grandis (Lane & Andretta, 1958)
Sylvicola guttatus (Schiner)[4]
Sylvicola hellwigi Meijere, 1913
Sylvicola hyalinus (Lane & Andretta, 1958)
Sylvicola incasicus (Lane & Andretta, 1958)
Sylvicola indicus (Brunetti, 1911)
Sylvicola indivisus (Edwards, 1923)
Sylvicola infumatus (Knab, 1912)
Sylvicola integratus (Edwards, 1933)
Sylvicola japonicus (Matsumura, 1915)
Sylvicola javanensis (Edwards, 1923)
Sylvicola konakovi Krivosheina, 2001
Sylvicola limpida (Edwards, 1923)
Sylvicola luteatus (Edwards, 1923)
Sylvicola maculipennis (Wulp, 1885)
Sylvicola malayensis (Edwards, 1923)
Sylvicola marginatus (Say, 1823)
Sylvicola marmoratus (Edwards, 1923)
Sylvicola matsumurai (Okada, 1935)
Sylvicola monachus (Harris, 1780)
Sylvicola neozelandicus (Schiner)[4]
Sylvicola nigroclavatus (Edwards, 1928)
Sylvicola notatus (Hutton, 1902)
Sylvicola notialis Stone, 1965
Sylvicola nubilipennis (Tollet, 1956)
Sylvicola oceana (Frey, 1949)
Sylvicola ornatus (Edwards, 1923)
Sylvicola pauperatus (Edwards, 1923)
Sylvicola philippinus (Edwards, 1929)
Sylvicola picturatus (Knab, 1912)
Sylvicola pulchricornis (Brunetti, 1911)
Sylvicola punctatus (Fabricius, 1787)
Sylvicola quadrivittatus (Edwards, 1928)
Sylvicola reconditus (Harris, 1780)
Sylvicola secretus (Harris, 1780)
Sylvicola separatus (Edwards, 1923)
Sylvicola stackelbergi Krivosheina & Menzel, 1998
Sylvicola suzukii (Matsumura, 1916)
Sylvicola tibialis (Edwards, 1923)
Sylvicola tucumanus (Lane & Andretta, 1958)
Sylvicola undulatus (Lamb, 1909)
Sylvicola varipes (Curran, 1934)
Sylvicola violovitshi Krivosheina, 2001
Sylvicola withycombei (Edwards, 1923)
Sylvicola wygodzinskyi (Lane & Andretta, 1958)
Sylvicola zetterstedi (Edwards, 1923)
Sylvicola zetterstedti (Edwards, 1923)
Sylvicola zhejianganus Yang & Cui, 1998
 † Anisopus carolae (Lewis, 1969)
 † Asarcomyia cadaver (Scudder, 1890)
 † Rhyphus hooleyi (Cockerell, 1921)
 † Rhyphus maculatus (Heer, 1849)
 † Rhyphus priscus (Brodie, 1845)
 † Rhyphus splendidus (Meunier, 1904)
 † Rhyphus thirionus (Meunier, 1904)

References

Further reading

External links

 

Anisopodidae
Articles created by Qbugbot
Bibionomorpha genera
Taxa named by Moses Harris